Omolon Airport  is a minor airport built 1 km north of Omolon in Chukotka Autonomous Okrug, Russia.

Airlines and destinations

References

Airports in Chukotka Autonomous Okrug